Connie Wilkins (who often uses the pseudonym Sacchi Green) is an American author of lesbian themed science fiction and fantasy erotica published under the title Wild Flesh. Wilkins is based in Massachusetts.

Personal life 

Connie Wilkins' father served in the Army Air Corps during WWII. He wanted to be a pilot however due to inner ear damage resulting from a childhood infection he was unqualified for the position. In the late 1960s Connie was married to a man in the Navy with whom she had a child. After a 6-month patrol in the Antarctic, he was stationed in San Francisco on instructor duty until he was discharged. Connie was inclined to join the anti-war protests that occurred by the time he was discharged from the service.

Career 

Connie Wilkins first qualified as an active member of the SFWA (Science Fiction and Fantasy Writers of America) selling various science fiction and fantasy short stories. Writing primarily for children, she decided to use the pseudonym Sacchi Green when selling her first erotica story to Best Lesbian Erotica in 1999. Her primary goal was to write stories primarily for children however, she soon found herself almost completely focused on writing erotic stories as Sacchi Green. After some years of writing her own stories and collecting submissions from other authors she decided to focus more on editorial work which she remains focused on to this day.

Lambda Awards 

Under her pseudonym Sacchi Green, Connie Wilkins has won two Lambda Literary Awards and received several nominations within the Lesbian Erotica Category. These works are listed as follows:

18th LLA for Lesbian Erotica (Nominated 2006) Rode Hard But Away Wet: Lesbian Cowboy Erotica co-edited by Sacchi Green and Rakelle Valencia, published by Suspect Thoughts

21st LLA for Lesbian Erotica (Nominated 2009) Lipstick on Her Collar by Sacchi Green published by Pretty Things Press

22nd LLA for Lesbian Erotica (Won 2010) - Lesbian Cowboys co-edited by Sacchi Green & Rakelle Valencia, published by Cleis Press

24th LLA for Lesbian Erotica (Nominated 2012) Lesbian Cops: Erotic Investigations co-edited by Sacchi Green and Rakelle Valencia, published by Cleis Press
(Nominated 2012) A Ride to Remember & Other Erotic Tales by Sacchi Green, published by Lethe Press

26th LLA for Lesbian Erotica (Won 2014)- Wild Girls Wild Nights: True Lesbian Sex Stories, edited by Sacchi Green and published by Cleis Press

List of works

Connie Wilkins 
 Freedom
 Healer
 Madly Deeply
 Meluse's Counsel
 One-Eyed Jack
 Pocket Apollo
 Steelwing
 Ten Thousand MilesThe Bridge
 The Heart of The Storm
 The Windskimmer
 Time Well Bent: Queer Alternative Histories
 Virtual Empathy

Sacchi Green 
 A Ride to Remember & Other Erotic Tales
 Best Lesbian Erotica of the Year, Vol. 1
 Flesh and Stone
 Freeing the Demon
 Girl Crazy: Coming Out Erotica
 Girl Fever: 69 Stories of Sudden Sex for Lesbians
 Hard Road, Easy Riding: Lesbian Biker Erotica
 Jessabel
 Lesbian Cops: Erotic Investigations
 Lesbian Cowboys: Erotic Adventures
 Lipstick on Her Collar
 Me and My Boi: Queer Erotic Stories
 Rode Hard But Away Wet: Lesbian Cowboy Erotica
 Spirit House Ranch
 The Dragon Descending
 Wild Girls Wild Nights: True Lesbian Sex Stories
 Women With Handcuffs: Lesbian Cop Erotica

See also

Cleis Press
Lesbian fiction
List of lesbian science fiction
Lambda Literary Award
Science Fiction and Fantasy Writers of America

References

American lesbian writers
20th-century American short story writers
21st-century American short story writers
American science fiction writers
American women short story writers
American erotica writers
Living people
Pseudonymous women writers
Lambda Literary Award winners
Women science fiction and fantasy writers
Women erotica writers
Year of birth missing (living people)
20th-century American women writers
21st-century American women writers
20th-century pseudonymous writers
21st-century pseudonymous writers
21st-century American LGBT people